Seminaarinmäen mieslaulajat (literally translated as "Men's Choir of Seminaarinmäki"), better known as Semmarit, is a male choir from Jyväskylä, Finland. Formed in 1989, the group is known for shunning traditional male choir music, instead singing choir music heavily influenced by rock and roll and pop music. Imaginative props and comedic choreography are also an integral part of their shows.

All songs are composed and regularly polled amongst the group members. Although a primarily vocal-only arrangement, the songs occasionally have an instrumental accompaniment. Instruments the group has used include the djembe, the didgeridoo, the kazoo, the bagpipes, a toilet lid, a zipper in the fly of their trousers, and water-filled beer bottles to imitate a pan flute. Some group members also physically use their colleagues as air guitars for playing "instrumental" solos.

Most of the singers are academically trained, singing non-professionally. The group doesn't perform often, and most concerts take place on annual tours. Seminaarinmäen mieslaulajat has toured in Finland, Estonia, Sweden, Germany, Switzerland, Portugal, Scotland, the United States, Canada and China. In 1996-1997, they  embarked on a sold-out tour in Finland with a symphony orchestra conducted by Atso Almila. The group consists of 17 singers and conductor Reima Viitala. Their lighting and sound technicians are so essential to the shows that they are considered to be members of the group.

Personnel
Choir leader: Reima Viitala
1st tenors: Turkka Saarikoski, Mikko Miettinen, Pasi Pohjola, and Pasi "Paatu" Niemelä
2nd tenors: Janne Kettunen, Jussi Oksala, Juha "Julle" Ikola, and Hannu Sompinmäki
1st bass: Markus Paananen, Juha "Juffe" Rouvala, Hannu Moilanen, and Kari-Pekka Kaskismaa
2nd bass: Juho-Kusti "Uski" Väätäinen, Jyrki Vihriälä, Joel Linna, Markus Kinnunen, and Tuomas Jauhiainen. 
Crew: Timo Ilmonen, Risto Ronkainen, Tuomas Käppi

Discography 
Kuka on tuo mies (Who Is That Man) (1993)
Ruohonjuuritasolla (Down-to-Earth) (1995)
Sampo Texas (Sampo Texas) (1996)
Ukkokiekuu (Mancrow) (1998)
Hakkaan sun ovee (Beating Your Door) (2001)
Wunderbaum (Wunderbaum) (2004)
Laulut ja Tarinat (Songs and Stories) (2007) 
Filminauhaa (Filmreel) (DVD, 2005)
20 - Kokoelma (2009)
Suuntaamme Avaruuteen Live (Heading Into Space Live) (2009)
Picchu Macho (2013)
Life Is a Highway (2014)
Hullun hommaa (2016)

External links
 Official website 

A cappella musical groups
Finnish musical groups